Robeyoncé Lima is a Brazilian lawyer, activist, and politician. She was elected state deputy for Pernambuco in 2018 and is the first trans woman elected official in the state. She was elected as part of the collective candidacy of JUNTAS 50180, which includes Carol Vergolino, Joelma Carla, Kátia Cunha, and Jô Cavalcanti. Her stated legislative goals center public safety, particularly for trans women. She has spoken out against Bolsonaro's negative comments about sexual minorities and the "intensification of oppression" that has occurred since his election. 

Lima is Afro-Brazilian and was born in Recife and raised in Pernambuco. She received her law degree from UFPE and currently works at the university. After passing the bar she provided legal advocacy to LGBT people, frequently pro bono. She is the first trans woman to practice law in Pernambuco.

References

External links 
 Robeyoncé Lima on Instagram

Year of birth missing (living people)
Living people
21st-century Brazilian women politicians
Brazilian politicians of African descent
Brazilian LGBT politicians
Brazilian women lawyers
Brazilian women activists
Transgender politicians
Afro-Brazilian people
Transgender women
Brazilian transgender people